Jeanie Thomas Gould Lincoln (1846 or 1853 – August 8, 1921) was an American novelist, author of romances and children's books, with a strong portion of historical fiction.  She published in various newspapers and magazines under the pen name "Daisy Ventnor."

She was born in Troy, New York.  In 1877 she married N. S. Lincoln, a prominent Washington doctor. Their children were G. Gould Lincoln and Natalie Sumner Lincoln.

Bibliography

Sources

External links
 
  
 Jeanie Gould's books at Open Library

1846 births
1921 deaths
American women novelists
American children's writers
20th-century American novelists
19th-century American novelists
American historical novelists
American women children's writers
20th-century American women writers
19th-century American women writers
Women historical novelists